Gana is a nickname, often a diminutive form (hypocorism) of Dragana. The nickname may also refer to:
 Gana Bala, an Indian playback singer
 Gana (outlaw), Nigerian criminal

References 

Lists of people by nickname
Hypocorisms